Los Primos de Durango ( Los Primos Mx ) are a Mexican Duranguense band. They formed in Vicente Guerrero, Durango in 2003.

Discography
2004: Grandres Exitos
2004: Mas Candela Duranguense 
2005: Nostalgia Duranguense
2006: Tal Vez
2007: Voy A Convencerte
2008 : Duelo De Nuevas Generaciones
2008 : En Vivo Su Gira Power Duranguense
2008: Con Fuego En Tu Piel...100 % Duranguense Light
2009 :Mi Mejor Regalo Una Decada Contigo “
2009: “Solo Para Fans “
2010 : Leyenda Duranguense
2010: Collecion Privada Las 20 Exclusivas
2011: ''Gruperas Que Hicieron 
Historia”
2011: 20 Del Recuerdo 
2011: 20 Temas
2012 :” Gruperas Que Hicieron Historia “ ( Edicion Especial)
2013 : Amor Brutal
2014: 30 Grandes Exitos
2014: Rescatando El Amor 
2016:20 Doradas y Adoradas Originales
2016:Y Sigue La Lumbre
2019: Lo Mas Escuchado De

References

Duranguense music groups